Transmitting Live is a 1994 live album by the Scottish Celtic rock band Runrig.

Track listing
 "Ùrlar" (Floor) – 2:10
 "Àrd" (High) – 6:11
 "Edge of the World" – 5:13
 "The Greatest Flame" – 6:18
 "Harvest Moon" – 6:11
 "The Wire" – 6:13
 "Precious Years" – 2:36
 "Every River" – 2:48
 "Flower of the West" – 6:39
 "Only the Brave" – 4:34
 "Alba" (Scotland) – 6:17
 "Pòg Aon Oidhche Earraich" (A Kiss One Spring Evening) – 5:04

Charts

References

Runrig albums
1994 live albums
Scottish Gaelic music